Manute may refer to:

Manute Bol, a Sudanese  basketball player, playing several seasons in the NBA
Manute, a fictional character in the comic Sin City